The Krewe of Proteus is a New Orleans Carnival Krewe founded in 1882, the oldest continuously parading Old Line Krewe.

History and formation

The Krewe of Proteus is the longest riding "Old Line" Night Parade Krewe in New Orleans Carnival after the Mistick Krewe and the Knights of Momus, stopped parading in 1992. The parade of the krewe of Proteus traditionally travels an Uptown or St. Charles route ending on Canal Street.  Parade floats still use original chassis from the early 1880s. Proteus is an offshoot of Mistick Krewe, and Knights of Momus - formed because the Mistick Krewe's waiting list was too long. Supposedly the Captain of the Mistick Krewe made the suggestion to form Proteus, as it was taking even too long for younger men of Comus families to get into Knights of Momus.

In 1991 the New Orleans City Council, led by Democrat Dorothy Mae Taylor, passed an ordinance that required social organizations, including Mardi Gras Krewes, to certify publicly that they did not discriminate on the basis of race, religion, gender, disability, or sexual orientation, in order to obtain parade permits and other public licensure. The Proteus organization (along with Momus and Comus, other 19th-century Krewes) withdrew from parading, rather than racially integrating. Two federal courts later decided that the ordinance was an unconstitutional infringement on First Amendment rights of free association and an unwarranted intrusion into the privacy of the groups subject to the ordinance. Proteus returned to parading in 2000.

Parade
Krewe of Proteus parades on the evening of Lundi Gras prior to the Krewe of Orpheus. The parade follows the uptown route for parades starting at Napoleon Avenue and Magazine Street; proceed north to St. Charles; proceed east on St. Charles to Lee Circle continuing on St. Charles to Canal Street.
Krewe of Proteus utilize flambeaux to light the parade route.

Parade themes
The Krewe of Proteus keep the season parade and ball theme secret until Lundi Gras.

Gallery

Floats and Costumes

Invitation

Buelletin

Program

See also
Knights of Momus
Mistick Krewe
Twelfth Night Revelers
The Boston Club

References

External links
 

Louisiana Creole culture in New Orleans
Mardi Gras in New Orleans